Divine Secrets of the Ya-Ya Sisterhood is a 2002 American comedy-drama film starring an ensemble cast headed by Sandra Bullock, co-written and directed by Callie Khouri. It is based on Rebecca Wells' 1996 novel of the same name and its 1992 prequel collection of short stories, Little Altars Everywhere.

Plot
In 1937 Louisiana, four little girls in the woods at night take a blood oath of loyalty to one another, led by Vivi Abbott, who dubs the group the "Ya-Ya Sisterhood."

In 1990s New York City, Vivi's eldest daughter, playwright Siddalee "Sidda" Walker, gives an interview with a reporter from Time, mentioning her unhappy childhood as a major source of inspiration for her work. The reporter sensationalizes Sidda's complaint, implying abuse and deep, dark family secrets. The article upsets Vivi, who calls Sidda and angrily declares that she is dead to her. Vivi cuts Sidda from her will, and Sidda disinvites Vivi from her upcoming wedding to fiancé Connor McGill.

Still friends despite the years, the other Ya-Ya Sisters, Caro Benett, Teensy Whitman, and Necie Kelleher, decide to take the matter into their own hands. They kidnap Sidda in New York and take her back to Louisiana, hoping to show her how Vivi's troubled past has caused her present issues, including her fight with Sidda.

As the Sisters show Sidda Vivi's scrapbook, Divine Secrets of the Ya-Ya Sisterhood, a series of flashbacks depicts Vivi's turbulent history from her childhood to Sidda's, which include Vivi witnessing racism at Teensy's aunt and uncle's house, being falsely accused of incest with her father Taylor by her bitter and jealous mother Buggy, and losing the love of her life Jack Whitman, Teensy's older brother, to an airplane crash in World War II. Sidda is unmoved in her opinion of Vivi as self-centered and helpless, and is so upset she tells Connor she wants to postpone their wedding. It is revealed that the main source of conflict in Sidda and Vivi's relationship is an incident where Vivi had a nervous breakdown and brutally beat Sidda and her siblings. Unbeknownst to Sidda, Vivi had been prescribed a dangerous dosage of antidepressant Dexamyl, which caused her erratic behavior; she had to be hospitalized following the incident.

With this revelation, Sidda finally understands her mother's suffering. Vivi and Sidda reconcile, and Sidda decides that she wants to marry Connor in Louisiana. Vivi and the Sisters induct Sidda into the Ya-Ya Sisterhood.

Cast
 Sandra Bullock as Siddalee "Sidda" Walker
 Allison Bertolino as the child Sidda
 Angus Macfadyen as Connor McGill
 Ellen Burstyn as Viviane Joan "Vivi" Abbott Walker
 Ashley Judd as young Vivi Abbott-Walker
 Caitlin Wachs as the child Vivi Abbott
 James Garner as Shepherd James "Shep" Walker
 David Lee Smith as young Shep
 Maggie Smith as Caroline Eliza "Caro" Brewer Bennett
 Katy Selverstone as young Caro
 Mary Katherine Weiss as the child Caro
 Fionnula Flanagan as Aimee Malissa "Teensy" Whitman
 Jacqueline McKenzie as young Teensy
 Alyssa May Gold as the child Teensy 
 Shirley Knight as Denise Rose "Necie" Kelleher Ogden
 Kiersten Warren as young Necie
 Nicki Tschudi as the child Necie
 Matthew Settle as Jack Whitman
 Cherry Jones as "Buggy" Abbott, Vivi's mother
 David Rasche as Taylor Abbot, Vivi's father
 Gina McKee as Genevieve Whitman, Teensy's mother
 Mark Joy as Mr. Whitman, Teensy's father

Reception

Box office
Divine Secrets grossed a domestic total of $69,599,016 and $4,240,224 outside the States, totaling $73,839,240 worldwide.  The film opened at #2 the weekend of its release with $16,167,412 behind The Sum of All Fearss second weekend.

Critical response
Divine Secrets of the Ya-Ya Sisterhood received a mixed response from film critics.  The film holds a 44% "Rotten" rating on the review aggregator Rotten Tomatoes with the consensus, "Divine Secrets of the Ya-Ya Sisterhood is more melodramatic than emotionally truthful, and uneven in its mixture of time periods, actresses, laughter and tears."

Roger Ebert of the Chicago Sun-Times gave the film only one-and-a-half out of four stars, writing, "The Ya-Ya Sisterhood is rubber-stamped from the same mold that has produced an inexhaustible supply of fictional Southern belles who drink too much, talk too much, think about themselves too much, try too hard to be the most unforgettable character you've ever met, and are, in general, insufferable."  He added, "There is not a character in the movie with a shred of plausibility, not an event that is believable, not a confrontation that is not staged, not a moment that is not false."  Todd McCarthy of Variety similarly remarked, "While there are pleasures to be had from watching so many grand actresses strut their stuff, the fact is that the overriding preoccupation here rests with surface impressions rather than psychological probity."

Conversely, Stephen Holden of The New York Times gave the film a more positive review, describing it as "resolutely for and about women" and observing, "For all its failed connections, Divine Secrets of the Ya-Ya Sisterhood is nurturing, in a gauzy, dithering way."  Kenneth Turan of the Los Angeles Times also praised the film, saying, "This is a work of excess and passion, an untidy sprawl of a motion picture that is sometimes ragged, occasionally uncertain, but--and this is what's important--always warm, accessible and rich in emotional life."

References

External links

  at Warner Bros.
 

2002 films
2002 comedy films
2002 drama films
2002 comedy-drama films
2002 directorial debut films
2000s English-language films
2000s female buddy films
American comedy-drama films
American buddy comedy-drama films
American female buddy films
Films based on American novels
Films based on short fiction
Films based on multiple works of a series
Films scored by T Bone Burnett
Films scored by David Mansfield
Films set in 1937
Films set in the 1990s
Films set in Louisiana
Films shot in North Carolina
Films about mother–daughter relationships
Warner Bros. films
Films directed by Callie Khouri
2000s American films